Wu Zao (1799–1862) was a Chinese poet. She was also known as Wu Pinxiang 
() and Yucenzi.

Background and career
The daughter of a merchant, she was born in the town of Renhe (now Hangzhou) in Zhejiang province. She married a merchant named Huang. Her contemporaries were wont to point out that her husband and father had "never even glanced at a book".

She was famous as a lyrics (ci) writer, in which she was considered one of the best of the Qing dynasty. She also wrote poetry in the sanqu form. She was said to be a good player of the qin, a stringed instrument. Wu wrote an opera (zaju) Yinjiu du Sao (Reading the "Li Sao" While Drinking), also known as Qiaoying (The Fake Image). Two collections of her works were published: Hualian ci (Flower curtain lyrics) and Xiangnan xuebei ci (Lyrics from South of the Fragrance and North of the Snows). She became a student of the poet Chen Wenshu.
She was one of a number of early nineteenth-century women poets who wrote about the novel Dream of the Red Chamber.

Wu converted to Buddhism later in life.

Translations
Several of her works have been translated into English, notably by Anthony Yu.

References

External links
Some of her poems can be found on the Ming Qing Women Writers database.

1799 births
1862 deaths
Qing dynasty poets
Chinese women poets
Chinese Buddhists
Writers from Hangzhou
Poets from Zhejiang
19th-century Chinese poets
19th-century women writers